Namibia competed in the 2007 All-Africa Games held at the Stade du 5 Juillet in the city of Algiers, Algeria. It was the fifth time that the country had sent a team to the Games since gaining independence and they left with three medals, one of the lowest counts to date. Two medals were won by Agnes Samaria in athletics. Herunga Jipekapora also broke the national record in 400 metres during the heats.

Competitors
Namibia entered a wide range of athletics competitions, including 100 metres, 200 metres, 400 metres, 800 metres, 1500 metres, half marathon, high jump, long jump and triple jump. During the 400 metre heats, Herunga Jipekapora ran a new national record of 52.46. The country also competed in other events, including boxing, where Immanuel Naidjala, Japhet Uutoni and Johannes Simon all made it to the quarter finals.

Medal summary
Namibia won only three medals, joint lowest in the history of the country's participation in the Games.

Medal table

List of Medalists

Silver Medal

Bronze Medal

See also
 Namibia at the African Games

References

2007 in Namibian sport
2007